Pitchcombe is a village and civil parish  south of Gloucester, in the Stroud district, in the county of Gloucestershire, England. In 2011 the parish had a population of 232. The parish touches Harescombe, Painswick and Whiteshill and Ruscombe.

Landmarks 
There are 27 listed buildings in Pitchcombe. Pitchcombe has a church called St John the Baptist and a village hall that was originally the village school.

History 
The name origin of "Pitchcombe" is uncertain and probably means 'Pincen's valley' but may mean 'pitch valley'. Pitchcombe has been called Pichelecumb, Pinchenecumbe and Pychecombe in the past. In 1327 Pitchcombe was in Standish parish.

References 

Villages in Gloucestershire
Civil parishes in Gloucestershire
Stroud District